Shadows is a 2020 Italian thriller drama film directed by Carlo Lavagna.

Cast
Mia Threapleton as Alma 
Lola Petticrew as Alex
Saskia Reeves as Mother

Release
The film premiered at Rome Film Festival, as part of the "Alice nella città" section, on 21 October 2020. It was expected to be theatrically released on 16 November 2020, but it was delayed due to the second outbreak of the COVID-19 pandemic in Italy. The film was released via pay-per-view channel Sky Primafila Premiere on 19 November 2020.

References

External links

2020 films
2020 thriller drama films
English-language Italian films
Films about dysfunctional families
2020s dystopian films
2020s English-language films
Italian thriller drama films